Mon Mane Na is a 2008 Indian Bengali-language romance film directed by Sujit Guha. It was Dev's fourth movie altogether and his second movie with actress Koel Mallick. This movie is a remake of the 1995 American romantic comedy movie French Kiss. It also has a few scenes from the Hindi movies Jab We Met, Dilwale Dulhaniya Le Jayenge and from Dil Hai Ki Manta Nahin. It was loosely based on Pyaar To Hona Hi Tha

Plot
Rahul (Dev) and Ria (Koel Mallick) meet as they are independently travelling to Siliguri.  Ria is running away to meet her boyfriend, and Rahul wants to sell his loot. The destination for both is the hills of Darjeeling.

They step into each other's life as well as behind each other's back as they travel, as Rahul hides his loot in Ria's bag. It gets into the hands of a thief. For Rahul the loot is the only hope, and that is something Ria realizes on visiting Rahul's family. Things take a turn when Ria is heartbroken, as her relationship with her boyfriend falls apart.

She offers to aid Rahul and also makes a deal with her father. As things falls into place for one, the world shatters for the other.

Rahul and Ria meet again but in different circumstances, not on Earth. They both confess their love, and get married.

Cast
Tapas Paul as ACP Rehman, who was looking for Rahul (Dev) as he had stolen a necklace.
Dev as Rahul, who had stolen a necklace to arrange his sister's marriage as he was not so rich. He was going to Siliguri from Darjeeling and saw Barsha in a local bus and fell in love. 
Koel Mallick as Barsha,  who was the only daughter richest businessman Ronojoy; as he (Her father) announced Barsha's marriage with an unknown person on her birthday, she went out from her house because she was in love with Bonny. But later she fell in love with Rahul.
Biswajit Chakraborty as Ronojoy, Barsha's father, a rich businessman; who had announced Barsha's marriage with an unknown person. But when he understands that his daughter loves a boy (Bonny) he scolded her and Barsha went out from her house. Then he used a lot of steps to find her and at last, he had arranged marriage of Barsha with Rahul.
Subhashish Mukherjee as Ronojoy's assistant; who had followed Ronojoy and tried to find Barsha. 
Bhola Tamang as Rahman's PA
NK Salil as a pickpocket, who had stolen Barsha's bag with and the necklace. As a result, he was being beaten by Rahul.
Sumit Ganguly as Sona Da, a goon, who had kidnapped Barsha but not successfully as he was being beaten by Rahul.
Premjit Chatterjee as Bonnie, who was the lover of Barsha but he had a relation with another girl. At last he got beaten by Rahul.
Kaushik Banerjee as Rahul's brother, who asked Rahul to bring Barsha to prove that he was a brother of Him (Kaushik). 
Dilip Roy as Rahul's Grandfather, who was a big fan of cricket and asked Rahul to bring Barsha to fulfil his cricket team.

Soundtrack

Jeet Gannguli composed the music, and Priyo Chottopadhyay and Gautam Sushmit wrote the lyrics.

References

2008 films
2000s Bengali-language films
Bengali-language Indian films
Films directed by Sujit Guha
Films scored by Jeet Ganguly